Luiz Felipe da Silva Nunes (born 24 April 1997), commonly known as Luiz Felipe, is a Brazilian footballer who plays as a goalkeeper for Belenenses.

Career
Luiz Felipe is a product of Sport Club Internacional youth sportive system.

In February 2018 he signed a 3 years deal with the Ukrainian Premier League's FC Zorya Luhansk. He made a debut for the main-squad time in a match against S.C. Braga in the UEFA Europa League on 9 August 2018. And in the Ukrainian Premier League on 30 September 2018 in the match against FC Lviv.

In January 2020 Luiz Felipe signed for Campeonato Gaúcho club Aimoré.

References

External links
Profile at Zerozero 

1997 births
Living people
Sportspeople from Rio Grande do Sul
Brazilian footballers
Association football goalkeepers
Brazilian expatriate footballers
Brazilian expatriate sportspeople in Ukraine
Sport Club Internacional players
Expatriate footballers in Ukraine
FC Zorya Luhansk players
Clube Esportivo Aimoré players
Belenenses SAD players
Ukrainian Premier League players
Primeira Liga players
Brazilian expatriate sportspeople in Portugal
Expatriate footballers in Portugal